Maurice Cullen may refer to:

 Maurice Cullen (boxer) (1937–2001), English lightweight boxer
 Maurice Cullen (artist) (1866–1934), Canadian artist